Calamari Union is a 1985 Finnish surreal comedy film, the second full-length film by the director Aki Kaurismäki. The film's cast includes well-known Finnish actors and rock musicians.

Plot
Fifteen desperate men named Frank band together to escape from a repressive Kallio district of Helsinki. An English-speaking man named Pekka joins the barroom conspirators, whose avoidance of last names help them outsmart obstructing forces as they sneak through dark alleys and the tunnels of the Helsinki metro. Taking advantage of the night, their goal is to reach the magical seaside district of Eira.

Cast

Reception
An absurdist comedy, the film is considered to be a satirical cult classic. Caryn James of The New York Times described the film as "gleefully absurdist", adding that Kaurismäki "takes over the American gangster film and flavors it with his improbable humor". Others have drawn connections between The Saimaa Gesture and Calamari Union and the Finnish punk movement.

References

External links
 
 
 
 
 
 
 

1985 films
1980s Finnish-language films
Films shot in Finland
Films set in Helsinki
Films directed by Aki Kaurismäki
Finnish black-and-white films
1985 comedy films
Finnish comedy films